The Green Bay Packers are a professional American football franchise based in Green Bay, Wisconsin.  They are currently members of the North Division of the National Football Conference (NFC) in the National Football League (NFL), and are the third-oldest franchise in the NFL.  Founded in 1919 by coach, player, and future Hall of Fame inductee Curly Lambeau and sports and telegraph editor George Whitney Calhoun, the Packers organization has become one of the most successful professional football teams, having won a total of 13 professional American football championships—nine NFL Championships and four Super Bowls—the most in the NFL.  The franchise has recorded 18 NFL divisional titles, eight NFL conference championships, and the second most regular season and overall victories of any NFL franchise, behind the Chicago Bears.

From the inaugural season in 1919 to the completion of the 2007 NFL season, 1493 NFL players have played at least one regular season or playoff game for the Green Bay Packers.  26 of these individuals have been inducted into the Pro Football Hall of Fame, while 109 have been inducted into the Green Bay Packers Hall of Fame (22 players have been inducted into both).

Key

Players

S

{| class="wikitable sortable" style="text-align: center;" width = 68%;
|-
!width=15%|Player name
!width=7%|Position
!width=20%|College
!width=15%|Seasons
!width=6%|Games
|-
|style="text-align:left;"|
|RB
|style="text-align:left;"|Ohio State
|2011–12
|14
|-
|style="text-align:left;"|
|T
|style="text-align:left;"|California
|1992
|4
|-
|style="text-align:left;"|
|G
|style="text-align:left;"|California-Los Angeles
|1957–58
|24
|-
|style="text-align:left;"|
|B
|style="text-align:left;"|Toledo
|1942, 45
|10
|-
|style="text-align:left;"|
|DB
|style="text-align:left;"|Arkansas
|1978–79
|31
|-
|style="text-align:left;"|
|G
|style="text-align:left;"|Pittsburgh
|1983
|3
|-
|style="text-align:left;"|
|P
|style="text-align:left;"|Ohio State
|2005
|14
|-
|style="text-align:left;"|
|B
|style="text-align:left;"|Louisiana State
|1952–53
|13
|-
|style="text-align:left;"|
|DT
|style="text-align:left;"|Tennessee-Chattanooga
|2003
|1
|-
|style="text-align:left;"|
|T
|style="text-align:left;"|Villanova
|1956
|12
|-
|style="text-align:left;"|
|C
|style="text-align:left;"|St. Edward's
|1933
|7
|-
|style="text-align:left;"|
|FB
|style="text-align:left;"|North Alabama
|1996
|1
|-
|style="text-align:left;"|
|C
|style="text-align:left;"|North Carolina
|2012
|14
|-
|style="text-align:left;"|
|B
|style="text-align:left;"|Nebraska
|1935–37
|20
|-
|style="text-align:left;"|
|FB
|style="text-align:left;"|Southern California
|1931
|9
|-
|style="text-align:left;"|
|S
|style="text-align:left;"|Maryland
|2019–present
|
|-
|style="text-align:left;"|
|DB
|style="text-align:left;"|North Texas State
|1975
|7
|-
|style="text-align:left;"|
|G
|style="text-align:left;"|Iowa
|1937
|8
|-
|style="text-align:left;"|
|E
|style="text-align:left;"|Nebraska
|1936–38
|26
|-
|style="text-align:left;"|
|FB
|style="text-align:left;"|Texas Tech
|1946–49
|46
|-
|style="text-align:left;"|
|FB
|style="text-align:left;"|No College
|1921
|6
|-
|style="text-align:left;"|
|C
|style="text-align:left;"|Lewis
|1952
|7
|-
|style="text-align:left;"|
|C
|style="text-align:left;"|Hofstra
|1974
|14
|-
|style="text-align:left;"|
|B
|style="text-align:left;"|Iowa
|1935–39
|40
|-
|style="text-align:left;"|
|C
|style="text-align:left;"|Marquette
|1938
|3
|-
|style="text-align:left;"|
|WR
|style="text-align:left;"|Wisconsin–La Crosse
|1994, 97–2001
|74
|-
|style="text-align:left;"|
|G
|style="text-align:left;"|Louisiana State
|1951
|12
|-
|style="text-align:left;"|
|C/DB
|style="text-align:left;"|Marquette
|1950–51
|24
|-
|style="text-align:left;"|
|T
|style="text-align:left;"|Memphis State
|1974
|14
|-
|style="text-align:left;"|
|LB
|style="text-align:left;"|Minnesota
|1986
|12
|-
|style="text-align:left;"|
|T
|style="text-align:left;"|Minnesota
|1939–41
|21
|-
|style="text-align:left;"|
|P
|style="text-align:left;"|Buffalo
|2016
|16
|-
|style="text-align:left;"|
|T
|style="text-align:left;"|Oregon State
|1934–36, 43–44
|46
|-
|style="text-align:left;"|
|P
|style="text-align:left;"|Alabama
|2018–20
|
|-
|style="text-align:left;"|
|WR
|style="text-align:left;"|Grambling State
|1987–88
|24
|-
|style="text-align:left;"|
|LB
|style="text-align:left;"|Alabama
|1981–86
|78
|-
|style="text-align:left;"|
|P
|style="text-align:left;"|Kansas
|1983–84
|32
|-
|style="text-align:left;"|
|C
|style="text-align:left;"|No College
|1922
|2
|-
|style="text-align:left;"|
|E
|style="text-align:left;"|Nebraska
|1940
|1
|-
|style="text-align:left;"|
|T
|style="text-align:left;"|Wisconsin
|1934–38, 40
|48
|-
|style="text-align:left;"|
|B
|style="text-align:left;"|Wisconsin
|1952, 54–55
|26
|-
|style="text-align:left;"|
|G
|style="text-align:left;"|Kentucky
|1952
|11
|-
|style="text-align:left;"|
|HB
|style="text-align:left;"|Oregon
|1958
|12
|-
|style="text-align:left;"|
|WR
|style="text-align:left;"|South Carolina
|1988–94
|112
|-
|style="text-align:left;"|
|CB/S
|style="text-align:left;"|William & Mary
|1997–2004
|121
|-
|style="text-align:left;"|
|B
|style="text-align:left;"|Texas
|1932
|2
|-
|style="text-align:left;"|
|QB
|style="text-align:left;"|Trinity (Conn.)
|1986
|3
|-
|style="text-align:left;"|
|CB
|style="text-align:left;"|Miami (Florida)
|2010–16
|8
|-
|style="text-align:left;"|
|T
|style="text-align:left;"|Nebraska
|1940
|3
|-
|style="text-align:left;"|
|NT
|style="text-align:left;"|Wisconsin
|1985
|4
|-
|style="text-align:left;"|
|RB/KR
|style="text-align:left;"|Brigham Young
|1991
|11
|-
|style="text-align:left;"|
|LB
|style="text-align:left;"|North Carolina
|1979
|16
|-
|style="text-align:left;"|
|DB
|style="text-align:left;"|Southern Methodist
|1986
|6
|-
|style="text-align:left;"|
|LB
|style="text-align:left;"|Clemson
|1993–97
|64
|-
|style="text-align:left;"|
|LB
|style="text-align:left;"|Michigan
|1988
|7
|-
|style="text-align:left;"|
|RB
|style="text-align:left;"|Tennessee State
|1977–79
|43
|-
|style="text-align:left;"|
|C
|style="text-align:left;"|Oklahoma
|1987
|3
|-
|style="text-align:left;"|
|T/G
|style="text-align:left;"|Nebraska
|1992–95
|47
|-
|style="text-align:left;"|
|G
|style="text-align:left;"|Central Florida
|2008–15
|
|-
|style="text-align:left;"|
|NT
|style="text-align:left;"|California
|1983
|9
|-
|style="text-align:left;"|
|FB
|style="text-align:left;"|Gonzaga
|1927
|2
|-
|style="text-align:left;"|
|G
|style="text-align:left;"|Purdue
|1955–56
|24
|-
|style="text-align:left;"|
|T
|style="text-align:left;"|Arkansas
|1978
|15
|-
|style="text-align:left;"|
|DE
|style="text-align:left;"|Notre Dame
|1947
|9
|-
|style="text-align:left;"|
|T
|style="text-align:left;"|Indiana
|1956, 59–68
|146
|-
|style="text-align:left;"|
|DT
|style="text-align:left;"|Florida
|2021–present
|
|-
|style="text-align:left;"|
|LB
|style="text-align:left;"|Southern Mississippi
|2003
|1
|-
|style="text-align:left;"|
|T
|style="text-align:left;"|Purdue
|1930–31
|26
|-
|style="text-align:left;"|
|WR
|style="text-align:left;"|Florida State
|1973–75
|41
|-
|style="text-align:left;"|
|RB
|style="text-align:left;"|Richmond
|1974–80
|67
|-
|style="text-align:left;"|
|E
|style="text-align:left;"|Alabama
|1933
|9
|-
|style="text-align:left;"|
|LB
|style="text-align:left;"|Purdue
|1977
|1
|-
|style="text-align:left;"|
|B
|style="text-align:left;"|Minnesota
|1945–48
|23
|-
|style="text-align:left;"|
|RB
|style="text-align:left;"|Utah
|1970
|7
|-
|style="text-align:left;"|
|DE
|style="text-align:left;"|Southern
|1971
|4
|-
|style="text-align:left;"|
|E
|style="text-align:left;"|Ripon
|1922
|n/a
|-
|style="text-align:left;"|
|HB
|style="text-align:left;"|Texas Mines
|1948–49
|15
|-
|style="text-align:left;"|
|B
|style="text-align:left;"|New York University
|1937
|2
|-
|style="text-align:left;"|
|T
|style="text-align:left;"|Southern California
|1935–37, 39 
|40
|-
|style="text-align:left;"|
|DT
|style="text-align:left;"|Georgia
|1997, 99
|19
|-
|style="text-align:left;"|
|G
|style="text-align:left;"|Wisconsin
|1956
|3
|-
|style="text-align:left;"|
|FB
|style="text-align:left;"|California-Los Angeles
|1996
|1
|-
|style="text-align:left;"|
|DT/DE
|style="text-align:left;"|Florida State
|2003–04
|13
|-
|style="text-align:left;"|
|RB
|style="text-align:left;"|North Carolina A&T
|2002
|1
|-
|style="text-align:left;"|
|WR
|style="text-align:left;"|Tennessee State
|1976–77
|25
|-
|style="text-align:left;"|
|DB
|style="text-align:left;"|Colorado State
|1973–76
|47
|-
|style="text-align:left;"|
|LB
|style="text-align:left;"|Mississippi State
|2019–present
|
|-
|style="text-align:left;"|
|G
|style="text-align:left;"|Notre Dame
|1927, 29
|10
|-
|style="text-align:left;"|
|E
|style="text-align:left;"|Wisconsin Teachers
|1922
|2
|-
|style="text-align:left;"|
|CB
|style="text-align:left;"|Notre Dame
|1998
|8
|-
|style="text-align:left;"|
|G
|style="text-align:left;"|Western Michigan
|1921
|2
|-
|style="text-align:left;"|
|WR
|style="text-align:left;"|East Texas State
|1987
|1
|-
|style="text-align:left;"|
|LB
|style="text-align:left;"|Kentucky
|2019–21
|
|-
|style="text-align:left;"|
|B
|style="text-align:left;"|California-Los Angeles
|1945
|2
|-
|style="text-align:left;"|
|T/G
|style="text-align:left;"|Stanford
|1972–74
|42
|-
|style="text-align:left;"|
|FB
|style="text-align:left;"|Richmond
|1999–2000
|24
|-
|style="text-align:left;"|
|LB
|style="text-align:left;"|Brigham Young
|2011–12
|8
|-
|style="text-align:left;"|
|G
|style="text-align:left;"|Utah State
|1943–45
|27
|-
|style="text-align:left;"|
|TE
|style="text-align:left;"|Yale
|1989
|6
|-
|style="text-align:left;"|
|G
|style="text-align:left;"|California-Los Angeles
|1946
|3
|-
|style="text-align:left;"|
|DE
|style="text-align:left;"|San Diego State
|1983
|13
|-
|style="text-align:left;"|
|T
|style="text-align:left;"|Oklahoma A&M
|1950–51
|14
|-
|style="text-align:left;"|
|T
|style="text-align:left;"|Kansas
|1957–58
|24
|-
|style="text-align:left;"|
|WR
|style="text-align:left;"|Northern Illinois
|1969–71
|40
|-
|style="text-align:left;"|
|G
|style="text-align:left;"|Alcorn A&M
|1955–56
|7
|-
|style="text-align:left;"|
|G
|style="text-align:left;"|Louisville
|2006–10
|28
|-
|style="text-align:left;"|
|T
|style="text-align:left;"|Houston
|2003
|2
|-
|style="text-align:left;"|
|QB
|style="text-align:left;"|Arizona State
|1978
|6
|-
|style="text-align:left;"|
|P
|style="text-align:left;"|Michigan State
|1981–82
|25
|-
|style="text-align:left;"|
|WR
|style="text-align:left;"|Missouri
|1972–74
|39
|-
|style="text-align:left;"|
|T
|style="text-align:left;"|DePaul
|1931–32
|27
|-
|style="text-align:left;"|
|WR
|style="text-align:left;"|Mesa State
|1985–88
|48
|-
|style="text-align:left;"|
|T
|style="text-align:left;"|Denver
|1950–51
|15
|-
|style="text-align:left;"|
|RB
|style="text-align:left;"|Wisconsin
|1976
|6
|-
|style="text-align:left;"|
|RB
|style="text-align:left;"|Buffalo
|2010–16
|1
|-
|style="text-align:left;"|
|WR
|style="text-align:left;"|Michigan
|1973
|2
|-
|style="text-align:left;"|
|QB
|style="text-align:left;"|Alabama
|1956–71
|196
|-
|style="text-align:left;"|
|B
|style="text-align:left;"|St. Mary's (California)
|1942–45
|27
|-
|style="text-align:left;"|
|TE
|style="text-align:left;"|Mesa State
|2004–05
|17
|-
|style="text-align:left;"|
|E
|style="text-align:left;"|Rice
|1939
|3
|-
|style="text-align:left;"|
|DB
|style="text-align:left;"|Alabama
|1950–51
|24
|-
|style="text-align:left;"|
|K
|style="text-align:left;"|Montana State
|1980–83
|45
|-
|style="text-align:left;"|
|LB
|style="text-align:left;"|Arizona State
|1987–91
|72
|-
|style="text-align:left;"|
|RB
|style="text-align:left;"|Northwestern State
|1993
|5
|-
|style="text-align:left;"|
|G/C
|style="text-align:left;"|West Virginia
|1951–55
|49
|-
|style="text-align:left;"|
|RB
|style="text-align:left;"|Central Oklahoma
|1987
|2
|-
|style="text-align:left;"|
|TE
|style="text-align:left;"|Texas A&M
|2019–2021
|
|-
|style="text-align:left;"|
|QB
|style="text-align:left;"|Texas-El Paso
|1968–69
|3
|-
|style="text-align:left;"|
|LB
|style="text-align:left;"|Minnesota
|1979
|3
|-
|style="text-align:left;"|
|S
|style="text-align:left;"|Wisconsin
|1985–89
|65
|-
|style="text-align:left;"|
|G/T
|style="text-align:left;"|Eastern Michigan
|2000–01
|24
|-
|style="text-align:left;"|
|CB
|style="text-align:left;"|Georgia
|2021–present
|
|-
|style="text-align:left;"|
|T
|style="text-align:left;"|Oregon
|1978–82
|63
|-
|style="text-align:left;"|
|E
|style="text-align:left;"|Southern California
|1942
|8
|-
|style="text-align:left;"|
|TE
|style="text-align:left;"|Ohio State
|2013
|9
|-
|style="text-align:left;"|
|LB
|style="text-align:left;"|Purdue
|1994–95
|30
|-
|style="text-align:left;"|
|T
|style="text-align:left;"|North Dakota State
|1937
|7
|-
|style="text-align:left;"|
|DE
|style="text-align:left;"|San Jose State
|1987
|3
|-
|style="text-align:left;"|
|CB
|style="text-align:left;"|Georgia State
|2019–2021
|
|-
|style="text-align:left;"|
|DB
|style="text-align:left;"|California
|1986
|6
|-
|style="text-align:left;"|
|B
|style="text-align:left;"|Utah
|1949–51
|35
|-
|style="text-align:left;"|
|TE
|style="text-align:left;"|Boise State
|1987
|3
|-
|style="text-align:left;"|
|LB
|style="text-align:left;"|TCU
|2019–21
|
|-
|style="text-align:left;"|
|CB
|style="text-align:left;"|Montana
|1989
|3
|-
|style="text-align:left;"|
|C
|style="text-align:left;"|Minnesota
|1937, 39
|21
|-
|style="text-align:left;"|
|C/LB
|style="text-align:left;"|Minnesota
|1935–37, 40–41
|52
|-
|style="text-align:left;"|
|T/C
|style="text-align:left;"|Boston College
|1980–86
|84
|-
|style="text-align:left;"|
|CB
|style="text-align:left;"|Nebraska
|2002–03
|9
|-
|style="text-align:left;"|
|B
|style="text-align:left;"|Kansas State
|1954–55
|24
|-
|style="text-align:left;"|
|FB
|style="text-align:left;"|Kansas
|1992
|16
|-
|style="text-align:left;"|
|DB
|style="text-align:left;"|Florida
|1957–62
|76
|-
|style="text-align:left;"|
|T
|style="text-align:left;"|North Carolina
|1950, 53–56
|55
|}

T

{| class="wikitable sortable" style="text-align: center;" width = 68%;
|-
!width=15%|Player name
!width=7%|Position
!width=20%|College
!width=15%|Seasons
!width=6%|Games
|-
|style="text-align:left;"|Jerry Tagge
|QB
|style="text-align:left;"|Nebraska
|1972–74
|18
|-
|style="text-align:left;"|Damon Tassos
|G
|style="text-align:left;"|Texas A&M
|1947–49
|26
|-
|style="text-align:left;"|Claude Taugher
|FB
|style="text-align:left;"|Marquette
|1922
|2
|-
|style="text-align:left;"|Mark Tauscher
|T/G
|style="text-align:left;"|Wisconsin
|2000–10
|109
|-
|style="text-align:left;"|Aaron Taylor
|G
|style="text-align:left;"|Notre Dame
|1995–97
|46
|-
|style="text-align:left;"|Ben Taylor
|LB
|style="text-align:left;"|Virginia Tech
|2006
|10
|-
|style="text-align:left;"|Cliff Taylor
|RB
|style="text-align:left;"|Memphis State
|1976
|7
|-
|style="text-align:left;"|Jim Taylor
|FB
|style="text-align:left;"|Louisiana State
|1958–66
|118
|-
|style="text-align:left;"|Kitrick Taylor
|WR
|style="text-align:left;"|Washington State
|1992
|10
|-
|style="text-align:left;"|Lane Taylor
|G
|style="text-align:left;"|Oklahoma State
|2013
|
|-
|style="text-align:left;"|Lenny Taylor
|WR
|style="text-align:left;"|Tennessee
|1984
|2
|-
|style="text-align:left;"|Ryan Taylor
|TE
|style="text-align:left;"|North Carolina
|2011–14
|50
|-
|style="text-align:left;"|Willie Taylor
|WR
|style="text-align:left;"|Pittsburgh
|1978
|1
|-
|style="text-align:left;"|George Teague
|S
|style="text-align:left;"|Alabama
|1993–95
|47
|-
|style="text-align:left;"|Jim Temp
|DE
|style="text-align:left;"|Wisconsin
|1957–60
|43
|-
|style="text-align:left;"|Bob Tenner
|E
|style="text-align:left;"|Minnesota
|1935
|11
|-
|style="text-align:left;"|Pat Terrell
|S
|style="text-align:left;"|Notre Dame
|1998
|16
|-
|style="text-align:left;"|Deral Teteak
|LB/G
|style="text-align:left;"|Wisconsin
|1952–56
|49
|-
|style="text-align:left;"|Keith Thibodeaux
|CB
|style="text-align:left;"|Northwestern State
|2001
|7
|-
|style="text-align:left;"|John Thierry
|DE
|style="text-align:left;"|Alcorn State
|2000–01
|28
|-
|style="text-align:left;"|Ben Thomas
|DE
|style="text-align:left;"|Auburn
|1986
|9
|-
|style="text-align:left;"|Ike Thomas
|DB
|style="text-align:left;"|Bishop's
|1972–73
|25
|-
|style="text-align:left;"|Joey Thomas
|CB
|style="text-align:left;"|Montana State
|2004–05
|20
|-
|style="text-align:left;"|Lavale Thomas
|RB
|style="text-align:left;"|Fresno State
|1987–88
|2
|-
|style="text-align:left;"|Robert Thomas
|LB
|style="text-align:left;"|California, Los Angeles
|2005
|10
|-
|style="text-align:left;"|Bobby Thomason
|QB
|style="text-align:left;"|Virginia Military
|1951
|11
|-
|style="text-align:left;"|Jeff Thomason
|TE
|style="text-align:left;"|Oregon
|1995–99
|75
|-
|style="text-align:left;"|Arland Thompson
|G
|style="text-align:left;"|Baylor
|1981
|9
|-
|style="text-align:left;"|Aundra Thompson
|WR
|style="text-align:left;"|East Texas State
|1977–81
|63
|-
|style="text-align:left;"|Darrell Thompson
|RB
|style="text-align:left;"|Minnesota
|1990–94
|60
|-
|style="text-align:left;"|Jeremy Thompson
|DE
|style="text-align:left;"|Wake Forest
|2008–09
|15
|-
|style="text-align:left;"|John Thompson
|TE
|style="text-align:left;"|Utah State
|1979–82
|34
|-
|style="text-align:left;"|Tuffy Thompson
|B
|style="text-align:left;"|Minnesota
|1939
|1
|-
|style="text-align:left;"|Jeremy Thornburg
|S
|style="text-align:left;"|Northern Arizona
|2005
|4
|-
|style="text-align:left;"|Andrae Thurman
|WR
|style="text-align:left;"|Southern Oregon
|2004–05
|12
|-
|style="text-align:left;"|Fred Thurston
|G
|style="text-align:left;"|Valparaiso
|1959–67
|112
|-
|style="text-align:left;"|George Timberlake
|LB/G
|style="text-align:left;"|Southern California
|1955
|6
|-
|style="text-align:left;"|Adam Timmerman
|G
|style="text-align:left;"|South Dakota State
|1995–98
|61
|-
|style="text-align:left;"|Gerald Tinker
|WR
|style="text-align:left;"|Kent State
|1975
|6
|-
|style="text-align:left;"|Pete Tinsley
|G/LB
|style="text-align:left;"|Georgia
|1938–39, 41–45
|50
|-
|style="text-align:left;"|Nelson Toburen
|LB
|style="text-align:left;"|Wichita State
|1961–62
|24
|-
|style="text-align:left;"|Chuck Tollefson
|G
|style="text-align:left;"|Iowa
|1944–46
|18
|-
|style="text-align:left;"|Scott Tolzien
|QB
|style="text-align:left;"|Wisconsin
|2013–15
|32
|-
|style="text-align:left;"|Mike Tomczak
|QB
|style="text-align:left;"|Ohio State
|1991
|12
|-
|style="text-align:left;"|Jared Tomich
|DE
|style="text-align:left;"|Nebraska
|2002
|2
|-
|style="text-align:left;"|Tom Toner
|LB
|style="text-align:left;"|Idaho State
|1973, 75–77
|53
|-
|style="text-align:left;"|Clayton Tonnemaker
|LB/C
|style="text-align:left;"|Minnesota
|1950, 53–54
|36
|-
|style="text-align:left;"|Robert Tonyan
|TE
|style="text-align:left;"|Indiana State
|2018–present
|
|-
|style="text-align:left;"|Eric Torkelson
|RB
|style="text-align:left;"|Connecticut
|1974–79, 81
|93
|-
|style="text-align:left;"|Keith Traylor
|LB
|style="text-align:left;"|Central Oklahoma
|1993
|5
|-
|style="text-align:left;"|J. C. Tretter
|G
|style="text-align:left;"|Cornell
|2013–16
|31
|-
|style="text-align:left;"|Jordan Tripp
|LB
|style="text-align:left;"|Montana
|2016
|2
|-
|style="text-align:left;"|Bill Troup
|QB
|style="text-align:left;"|South Carolina
|1980
|2
|-
|style="text-align:left;"|R-Kal Truluck
|DE
|style="text-align:left;"|SUNY Cortland
|2004
|13
|-
|style="text-align:left;"|Esera Tuaolo
|NT/DE
|style="text-align:left;"|Oregon State
|1991–92
|20
|-
|style="text-align:left;"|Walter Tullis
|WR
|style="text-align:left;"|Delaware State
|1978–79
|32
|-
|style="text-align:left;"|Emlen Tunnell
|S
|style="text-align:left;"|Iowa
|1959–61
|37
|-
|style="text-align:left;"|Billy Turner
|G
|style="text-align:left;"|North Dakota State
|2019–21
|
|-
|style="text-align:left;"|Maurice Turner
|RB
|style="text-align:left;"|Utah State
|1985
|3
|-
|style="text-align:left;"|Richard Turner
|NT
|style="text-align:left;"|Oklahoma
|1981–83
|30
|-
|style="text-align:left;"|Wylie Turner
|DB
|style="text-align:left;"|Angelo State
|1979–80
|28
|-
|style="text-align:left;"|Miles Turpin
|LB
|style="text-align:left;"|California
|1986
|1
|-
|style="text-align:left;"|George Tuttle
|E
|style="text-align:left;"|Minnesota
|1927
|1
|-
|style="text-align:left;"|Frank Twedell
|G
|style="text-align:left;"|Minnesota
|1939
|4
|}

U
{| class="wikitable sortable" style="text-align: center;" width = 68%;
|-
!width=15%|Player name
!width=7%|Position
!width=20%|College
!width=15%|Seasons
!width=6%|Games
|-
|style="text-align:left;"|
|G/T 
|style="text-align:left;"|Auburn 
|1984–85, 87–88, 1990–91 
|64
|-
|style="text-align:left;"|
|S
|style="text-align:left;"|San Diego State
|2005
|16
|-
|style="text-align:left;"|
|B
|style="text-align:left;"|Minnesota
|1938–43
|62
|-
|style="text-align:left;"|
|E
|style="text-align:left;"|South Carolina
|1941, 44–45
|11
|-
|style="text-align:left;"|
|B
|style="text-align:left;"|Michigan
|1922, 24
|6
|}

V
{| class="wikitable sortable" style="text-align: center;" width = 68%;
|-
!width=15%|Player name
!width=7%|Position
!width=20%|College
!width=15%|Seasons
!width=6%|Games
|-
|style="text-align:left;"|
|E
|style="text-align:left;"|Notre Dame
|1935
|1
|-
|style="text-align:left;"|
|G
|style="text-align:left;"|Missouri
|1974–76
|29
|-
|style="text-align:left;"|
|B
|style="text-align:left;"|Minnesota
|1940–41
|20
|-
|style="text-align:left;"|
|C
|style="text-align:left;"|Pennsylvania
|2012–13
|10
|-
|style="text-align:left;"|
|C
|style="text-align:left;"|Arkansas
|1932–33
|9
|-
|style="text-align:left;"|
|RB
|style="text-align:left;"|Brigham Young
|1974
|5
|-
|style="text-align:left;"|
|LB/DE
|style="text-align:left;"|Massachusetts
|1966, 68–69
|38
|-
|style="text-align:left;"|
|DT
|style="text-align:left;"|Kansas
|1972
|13
|-
|style="text-align:left;"|
|G
|style="text-align:left;"|Minnesota
|1942
|8
|-
|style="text-align:left;"|
|WR
|style="text-align:left;"|Stanford
|1977
|6
|-
|style="text-align:left;"|
|T
|style="text-align:left;"|East Texas State
|1986–87, 89–90
|59
|-
|style="text-align:left;"|
|T/G
|style="text-align:left;"|Iowa
|1997–2000
|59
|-
|style="text-align:left;"|
|T
|style="text-align:left;"|Georgia Tech
|1957
|12
|-
|style="text-align:left;"|
|E
|style="text-align:left;"|Notre Dame
|1925
|12
|-
|style="text-align:left;"|
|T
|style="text-align:left;"|Minnesota-Duluth
|1992
|1
|-
|style="text-align:left;"|
|NT
|style="text-align:left;"|Bowling Green
|1987
|2
|-
|style="text-align:left;"|
|CB
|style="text-align:left;"|Vanderbilt
|1999
|16
|-
|style="text-align:left;"|
|FB
|style="text-align:left;"|Northwestern
|2018–19
|
|-
|style="text-align:left;"|
|G
|style="text-align:left;"|Wisconsin
|1948–49
|27
|-
|style="text-align:left;"|
|P
|style="text-align:left;"|Miami
|2017
|16
|-
|style="text-align:left;"|
|DT
|style="text-align:left;"|Nebraska
|1964–65
|28
|-
|style="text-align:left;"|
|E
|style="text-align:left;"|Detroit
|1924
|11
|}

W

 
{| class="wikitable sortable" style="text-align: center;" width = 68%;
|-
!width=15%|Player name
!width=7%|Position
!width=20%|College
!width=15%|Seasons
!width=6%|Games
|-
|style="text-align:left;"|
|LB
|style="text-align:left;"|William & Mary
|1998–99
|27
|-
|style="text-align:left;"|
|WR
|style="text-align:left;"|Tennessee State
|1975
|2
|-
|style="text-align:left;"|
|DT
|style="text-align:left;"|Tennessee State
|1974
|2
|-
|style="text-align:left;"|
|P
|style="text-align:left;"|Cal-State, Northridge
|1992–93
|23
|-
|style="text-align:left;"|
|B
|style="text-align:left;"|Carroll (Wis.)
|1921
|4
|-
|style="text-align:left;"|
|DB
|style="text-align:left;"|Wisconsin
|1976–79
|57
|-
|style="text-align:left;"|
|T/G
|style="text-align:left;"|Navy
|1998–2004
|97
|-
|style="text-align:left;"|
|C/LB
|style="text-align:left;"|Louisville
|1970
|11
|-
|style="text-align:left;"|
|CB
|style="text-align:left;"|Tuskegee
|2007
|12
|-
|style="text-align:left;"|
|WR
|style="text-align:left;"|Florida State
|2002–05
|48
|-
|style="text-align:left;"|
|G
|style="text=align:left;"|Middle Tennessee State
|2015
|13
|-
|style="text-align:left;"|
|C
|style="text-align:left;"|Rice
|1970
|11
|-
|style="text-align:left;"|
|P
|style="text-align:left;"|Northwestern State
|1974
|14
|-
|style="text-align:left;"|
|DT
|style="text-align:left;"|Troy State
|2001–03
|31
|-
|style="text-align:left;"|
|CB
|style="text-align:left;"|Texas Tech
|1993
|8
|-
|style="text-align:left;"|
|DB
|style="text-align:left;"|Southern Methodist
|1953–56
|46
|-
|style="text-align:left;"|
|DE
|style="text-align:left;"|West Virginia Tech
|1987
|1
|-
|style="text-align:left;"|
|QB
|style="text-align:left;"|Iowa State
|2013
|2
|-
|style="text-align:left;"|
|WR
|style="text-align:left;"|Kansas State
|2005
|1
|-
|style="text-align:left;"|
|TE
|style="text-align:left;"|Mississippi
|2003
|14
|-
|style="text-align:left;"|
|RB
|style="text-align:left;"|Colorado
|1972
|2
|-
|style="text-align:left;"|
|T/G
|style="text-align:left;"|Ohio State
|2006
|5
|-
|style="text-align:left;"|
|DT
|style="text-align:left;"|Nebraska
|2000, 02
|25
|-
|style="text-align:left;"|
|DB
|style="text-align:left;"|Arkansas
|1987
|3
|-
|style="text-align:left;"|
|CB
|style="text-align:left;"|Miami (FL)
|2016
|2
|-
|style="text-align:left;"|
|WR
|style="text-align:left;"|North Dakota State
|2022–present
|
|-
|style="text-align:left;"|
|WR
|style="text-align:left;"|Clemson
|2022–present
|
|-
|style="text-align:left;"|
|DB
|style="text-align:left;"|Southern California
|1986
|9
|-
|style="text-align:left;"|
|LB
|style="text-align:left;"|Mississippi
|2000–02
|44
|-
|style="text-align:left;"|
|WR
|style="text-align:left;"|Delaware State
|1990–91
|28
|-
|style="text-align:left;"|
|DT
|style="text-align:left;"|Cal-State, Los Angeles
|1966–67, 69
|34
|-
|style="text-align:left;"|
|LB
|style="text-align:left;"|Fresno State
|1975–79
|63
|-
|style="text-align:left;"|
|RB
|style="text-align:left;"|Tennessee
|1991
|2
|-
|style="text-align:left;"|
|E
|style="text-align:left;"|Kansas State
|1928
|3
|-
|style="text-align:left;"|
|K
|style="text-align:left;"|Arkansas
|1971
|4
|-
|style="text-align:left;"|
|LB
|style="text-align:left;"|Oklahoma
|1986–90
|52
|-
|style="text-align:left;"|
|E
|style="text-align:left;"|Southern California
|1944
|10
|-
|style="text-align:left;"|
|RB
|style="text-align:left;"|Wisconsin–Eau Claire
|1987
|2
|-
|style="text-align:left;"|
|B
|style="text-align:left;"|Willamette
|1938–40, 42
|24
|-
|style="text-align:left;"|
|LB
|style="text-align:left;"|Angelo State
|1987
|9
|-
|style="text-align:left;"|
|C
|style="text-align:left;"|Kansas
|1979–80
|20
|-
|style="text-align:left;"|
|E
|style="text-align:left;"|Georgia
|1946–49
|38
|-
|style="text-align:left;"|
|C/G
|style="text-align:left;"|Tennessee
|2004–07
|51
|-
|style="text-align:left;"|
|RB
|style="text-align:left;"|Southern Mississippi
|1975
|13
|-
|style="text-align:left;"|
|TE
|style="text-align:left;"|Auburn
|1984–94
|167
|-
|style="text-align:left;"|
|B
|style="text-align:left;"|Southern California
|1948
|3
|-
|style="text-align:left;"|
|CB
|style="text-align:left;"|Texas
|2002
|6
|-
|style="text-align:left;"|
|TE
|style="text-align:left;"|Stanford
|2000
|10
|-
|style="text-align:left;"|
|E
|style="text-align:left;"|Ripon
|1921–23
|22
|-
|style="text-align:left;"|
|DB
|style="text-align:left;"|Missouri
|1981–82
|25
|-
|style="text-align:left;"|
|S
|style="text-align:left;"|Florida
|1992
|15
|-
|style="text-align:left;"|
|C
|style="text-align:left;"|Southern Mississippi
|2005
|1
|-
|style="text-align:left;"|
|DB
|style="text-align:left;"|Georgia
|1954
|9
|-
|style="text-align:left;"|
|DE
|style="text-align:left;"|Tennessee
|1993–98
|95
|-
|style="text-align:left;"|
|LB
|style="text-align:left;"|Howard
|2006–07
|27
|-
|style="text-align:left;"|
|DB
|style="text-align:left;"|Auburn
|2016–18
|19
|-
|style="text-align:left;"|
|QB
|style="text-align:left;"|Furman
|1977–83
|54
|-
|style="text-align:left;"|
|S
|style="text-align:left;"|Michigan
|2003–04
|9
|-
|style="text-align:left;"|
|DB
|style="text-align:left;"|Texas Western
|1958–64
|88
|-
|style="text-align:left;"|
|G
|style="text-align:left;"|Michigan State
|2005
|15
|-
|style="text-align:left;"|
|WR
|style="text-align:left;"|Utah State
|1974
|1
|-
|style="text-align:left;"|
|P
|style="text-align:left;"|Tennessee
|1972–73
|26
|-
|style="text-align:left;"|
|G
|style="text-align:left;"|Boston College
|1993
|16
|-
|style="text-align:left;"|
|T
|style="text-align:left;"|Minnesota
|1946–51, 53
|74
|-
|style="text-align:left;"|
|E
|style="text-align:left;"|Indiana
|1925
|6
|-
|style="text-align:left;"|
|T
|style="text-align:left;"|Tennessee
|1996–97
|30
|-
|style="text-align:left;"|
|DE
|style="text-align:left;"|Temple
|2018
|3
|-
|style="text-align:left;"|
|DE/DT
|style="text-align:left;"|Gardner–Webb
|1994–97
|60
|-
|style="text-align:left;"|
|LB
|style="text-align:left;"|Texas
|2002–03
|12
|-
|style="text-align:left;"|
|RB
|style="text-align:left;"|Oregon
|1987
|3
|-
|style="text-align:left;"|
|E
|style="text-align:left;"|Pacific
|1959
|12
|-
|style="text-align:left;"|
|LB
|style="text-align:left;"|Southern California
|1995–2000
|45
|-
|style="text-align:left;"|
|DE
|style="text-align:left;"|Prairie View A&M
|1970–77
|111
|-
|style="text-align:left;"|
|DT
|style="text-align:left;"|Arkansas State
|2004–07
|56
|-
|style="text-align:left;"|
|RB
|style="text-align:left;"|Kansas
|1981
|1
|-
|style="text-align:left;"|
|RB
|style="text-align:left;"|Notre Dame
|2019
|
|-
|style="text-align:left;"|
|DE
|style="text-align:left;"|Auburn
|1997
|4
|-
|style="text-align:left;"|
|DB
|style="text-align:left;"|Howard
|1962–63
|10
|-
|style="text-align:left;"|
|RB
|style="text-align:left;"|BYU
|2017–20
|
|-
|style="text-align:left;"|
|LB
|style="text-align:left;"|Henderson State
|2000–01
|28
|-
|style="text-align:left;"|
|RB
|style="text-align:left;"|California-Los Angeles
|1993
|3
|-
|style="text-align:left;"|
|LB
|style="text-align:left;"|Ohio State
|1994
|16
|-
|style="text-align:left;"|
|RB
|style="text-align:left;"|Purdue
|1969–73
|69
|-
|style="text-align:left;"|
|CB
|style="text-align:left;"|Louisiana Tech 
|2007–14, 2018–19
|
|-
|style="text-align:left;"|
|RB/KR
|style="text-align:left;"|Arizona State
|1967–70
|48
|-
|style="text-align:left;"|
|CB
|style="text-align:left;"|Nebraska
|1996–2002
|111
|-
|style="text-align:left;"|
|RB
|style="text-align:left;"|Grambling State
|2004–05
|3
|-
|style="text-align:left;"|
|T
|style="text-align:left;"|Southern California
|1998
|16
|-
|style="text-align:left;"|
|LB
|style="text-align:left;"|Auburn
|1993–94
|25
|-
|style="text-align:left;"|
|TE
|style="text-align:left;"|Wesleyan
|1994–95
|13
|-
|style="text-align:left;"|
|FB
|style="text-align:left;"|Southern California
|1967
|14
|-
|style="text-align:left;"|
|WR
|style="text-align:left;"|Memphis State
|1990–91
|30
|-
|style="text-align:left;"|
|E/DB
|style="text-align:left;"|Southern Methodist
|1947–48
|21
|-
|style="text-align:left;"|
|RB
|style="text-align:left;"|Virginia
|1992–95
|48
|-
|style="text-align:left;"|
|G
|style="text-align:left;"|Wisconsin Teachers
|1921
|6
|-
|style="text-align:left;"|
|B
|style="text-align:left;"|Texas A&M
|1930–31
|13
|-
|style="text-align:left;"|
|S
|style="text-align:left;"|New Mexico
|1994
|3
|-
|style="text-align:left;"|
|E
|style="text-align:left;"|Louisiana State
|1950–52
|35
|-
|style="text-align:left;"|
|G
|style="text-align:left;"|California-Los Angeles
|1985
|2
|-
|style="text-align:left;"|
|LB
|style="text-align:left;"|Alabama
|1979, 81–84
|69
|-
|style="text-align:left;"|
|DE
|style="text-align:left;"|Memphis State
|1968–69
|21
|-
|style="text-align:left;"|
|G
|style="text-align:left;"|Tarleton State
|1971
|7
|-
|style="text-align:left;"|
|DE
|style="text-align:left;"|Boise State
|2020
|
|-
|style="text-align:left;"|
|HB
|style="text-align:left;"|North Carolina Central
|1960
|12
|-
|style="text-align:left;"|
|DE/NT
|style="text-align:left;"|Syracuse
|1988–90
|45
|-
|style="text-align:left;"|
|RB
|style="text-align:left;"|Oklahoma
|1983
|4
|-
|style="text-align:left;"|
|C/G
|style="text-align:left;"|Western Illinois
|1992–2002
|156
|-
|style="text-align:left;"|
|C
|style="text-align:left;"|Mississippi
|1971
|11
|-
|style="text-align:left;"|
|CB
|style="text-align:left;"|Louisiana Tech
|2005
|5
|-
|style="text-align:left;"|
|T
|style="text-align:left;"|Notre Dame
|2002
|2
|-
|style="text-align:left;"|
|C
|style="text-align:left;"|Kentucky
|1971–73
|42
|-
|style="text-align:left;"|
|B
|style="text-align:left;"|Gustavus Adolphus
|1934
|5
|-
|style="text-align:left;"|
|B
|style="text-align:left;"|Holy Cross
|1950
|11
|-
|style="text-align:left;"|
|T
|style="text-align:left;"|Alabama
|1940
|2
|-
|style="text-align:left;"|
|S
|style="text-align:left;"|Southern California
|1960–71
|166
|-
|style="text-align:left;"|
|G
|style="text-align:left;"|Marquette
|1922–31
|86
|-
|style="text-align:left;"|
|S
|style="text-align:left;"|Northern Michigan
|1990
|16
|-
|style="text-align:left;"|
|RB
|style="text-align:left;"|Texas A&M
|1988–91
|64
|-
|style="text-align:left;"|
|CB
|style="text-align:left;"|Michigan
|2006–12
|116
|-
|style="text-align:left;"|
|RB
|style="text-align:left;"|Ohio State
|1989–92
|56
|-
|style="text-align:left;"|
|DE
|style="text-align:left;"|Michigan State
|2012–13
|
|-
|style="text-align:left;"|
|G
|style="text-align:left;"|Nebraska
|1972–75
|46
|-
|style="text-align:left;"|
|QB
|style="text-align:left;"|Wisconsin
|1984–88
|46
|-
|style="text-align:left;"|
|T
|style="text-align:left;"|Alabama
|1964–67
|56
|-
|style="text-align:left;"|
|QB
|style="text-align:left;"|Florida
|2000
|1
|-
|style="text-align:left;"|
|G
|style="text-align:left;"|Notre Dame
|1934
|2
|-
|style="text-align:left;"|
|RB
|style="text-align:left;"|Florida
|2007–2009
|7
|-
|style="text-align:left;"|
|DE
|style="text-align:left;"|Georgia
|2009–11
|
|}

Y
{| class="wikitable sortable" style="text-align: center;" width = 68%;
|-
!width=15%|Player name
!width=7%|Position
!width=20%|College
!width=15%|Seasons
!width=6%|Games
|-
|style="text-align:left;"|
|CB
|style="text-align:left;"|Boston College
|2021
|16
|-
|style="text-align:left;"|
|G 
|style="text-align:left;"|Ohio State
|1929
|2
|-
|style="text-align:left;"|
|DB
|style="text-align:left;"|Purdue
|1956
|4
|-
|style="text-align:left;"|
|C
|style="text-align:left;"|Oklahoma
|1933
|2
|}

Z

{| class="wikitable sortable" style="text-align: center;" width = 68%;
|-
!width=15%|Player name
!width=7%|Position
!width=20%|College
!width=15%|Seasons
!width=6%|Games
|-
|style="text-align:left;"|
|G
|style="text-align:left;"|Ohio State
|1939–40
|14
|-
|style="text-align:left;"|
|LB
|style="text-align:left;"|Michigan
|1953–56
|48
|-
|style="text-align:left;"|
|G
|style="text-align:left;"|Indiana
|1932
|14
|-
|style="text-align:left;"|
|K
|style="text-align:left;"|Arizona
|1987–88
|18
|-
|style="text-align:left;"|
|C
|style="text-align:left;"|UCLA
|1993
|5
|-
|style="text-align:left;"|
|WR
|style="text-align:left;"|Northeast Louisiana
|1976
|2
|-
|style="text-align:left;"|Carl Zoll
|G
|style="text-align:left;"|No College
|1921–22
|1
|-
|style="text-align:left;"|Dick Zoll
|G
|style="text-align:left;"|Indiana
|1939
|1
|-
|style="text-align:left;"|Martin Zoll
|G
|style="text-align:left;"|No College
|1921
|1
|-
|style="text-align:left;"|
|LB
|style="text-align:left;"|Central Michigan
|2010–12
|
|-
|style="text-align:left;"|Jim Zorn
|QB
|style="text-align:left;"|Cal Poly-Pomona
|1985
|13
|-
|style="text-align:left;"|Dave Zuidmulder
|B
|style="text-align:left;"|St. Ambrose
|1929–31
|7
|-
|style="text-align:left;"|Al Zupek
|E
|style="text-align:left;"|Lawrence
|1946
|3
|-
|style="text-align:left;"|Merle Zuver
|C
|style="text-align:left;"|Nebraska
|1930
|10
|}

See also
List of Green Bay Packers players: A–D
List of Green Bay Packers players: E–K
List of Green Bay Packers players: L–R

References
General

Specific

S
players